The BMW GS series of one purpose off-road/on-road BMW motorcycles have been produced from 1980, when the R80G/S was launched, to the present day. The GS refers to either Gelände/Straße (German: off-road/road) or Gelände Sport.
GS motorcycles can be distinguished from other BMW models by their longer travel suspension, an upright riding position, and larger front wheels – typically 19 to 21 inch. In May 2009, the 500,000th GS was produced, an R1200GS model.

GS models
The GS has been available with a range of different engines, including single-cylinder, twin-cylinder water-cooled and twin-cylinder air- ("Airheads") and air/oil-cooled ("Oilheads" and "Hexheads").

Airheads

The first shaft driven GS model was the R80G/S with a 797.5 cc air-cooled, flat-twin boxer engine.  The BMW 247 engine, which was also fitted to many other bikes in the BMW range, is known as an airhead, because it relies on airflow across the cylinder heads and cylinder 'barrels' to provide most of the cooling for the engine. The most valued version was the R80G/S-PD "Paris-Dakar" model featuring a larger tank, which was launched in celebration of the R80G/S wins in the Paris Dakar Rally. In certain markets, a 649.6 cc R65GS version was also available. These early machines used a combined rear suspension and drive swingarm called a Monolever.

In 1987, the G/S name was changed to GS with the S meaning "Sport" rather than "Straße" and the Monolever was replaced with the Paralever swingarm, which included a torque arm intended to lessen shaft effect and strengthen the swingarm-to-final drive connection. The new bikes were produced with engines of 797.5 cc (R80GS) or 980 cc (R100GS).

Production of the standard machines stopped in 1995 with the R100GS-PD (unofficially Paris Dakar), but special "Kalahari" and "Basic" editions were made available in 1996 and 1997, which ended airhead GS production.

Airhead models still have a very strong following among adventure motorcyclists, due in part to the design of the machine being easy to access and simple to service, but also solid and reliable design concept.

Airhead production history
Monolever
R80G/S 1980–1986 
R80G/S-PD 1984–1987
R65GS 1987–1990 
Paralever
R80GS 1987–1994
R100GS 1987–1994
R100GS-PD 1988–1996
R80GS Basic 1996–1997 
R80GS Kalahari 1996–1997

Oilheads

In 1995, the introduction of the next generation R-259 or oilhead engine signalled BMW's entry into modern adventure models, with a succession of larger displacement models including the R850GS, R1100GS, R1150GS and the R1200GS. Later models have electronic engine management, ABS braking, twin spark plugs, and more power than airhead models, due in part to the use of four valve heads. 

The R1150GS and R1200GS are available in an Adventure version which adds a larger fuel tank, lower gearing, upgraded suspension, and optional offroad tires to make the Adventure more suitable for arduous off-road trips with a heavy load of gear and supplies. The horizontally opposed two-cylinder "boxer" engine provides a comparatively low centre of gravity compared to motorcycles with inline-4 or V-twin engines. This strongly contributes to the ability of these supra-litre class machines to travel on dirt roads and trails. The distribution of torque over a broad RPM range coupled with the relatively wide power pulses inherent in a long-stroke two-cylinder motor provides consistent and predictable traction on loose surfaces.

As with the airheads, all oilhead GS models are shaft driven. The front suspension, however, was changed from conventional forks to the Telelever, developed by British company Saxon Motodd, which uses a control arm, called an A-arm by BMW to eliminate dive under braking.

Oilhead production history
From the start of oilhead production in 1994 until 27 July 2007, a total of 219,468 oilhead GS bikes were produced.
Oilhead GS models are listed below together with production figures where known:

Although not strictly a GS, the following closely related models were also introduced by BMW:
 HP2 Enduro - 2005 – 2008
 HP2 Megamoto - since 2007

Single-cylinder chain-drive

In 1993, BMW introduced GS models powered by a single cylinder 4-valve 652 cc Rotax engine, also known as a thumper, and chain drive. The off-road-capable F650 Funduro had a 19-inch front wheel, long travel suspension, bash plate, and a high seat. The more road biased F650ST Strada had a smaller diameter 18 inch front wheel, narrower handlebars and smaller screen. The bikes were manufactured alongside the virtually identical 5-valve Aprilia Pegaso.

BMW introduced the fuel injected F650GS in 2000 following BMW's win in the 1999 Dakar Rally with a heavily modified F650RR ridden by Richard Sainct. A taller, more off-road biased Dakar version was introduced which included a taller screen, 21 inch front wheel and longer suspension travel. BMW re-branded the single-cylinder bike as the G650GS in some markets following the launch of the parallel twin-cylinder models in 2008. In 2010, at the EICMA show in Italy, BMW Motorrad announced the global availability of the G650GS with a slightly down-rated engine producing .

The single-cylinder bikes have a strong following and are thought by many of their riders to be better off-roaders than the heavier boxer-engined bikes. Like the larger two-cylinder models, they offer significant capacity to carry gear and supplies over long distances. Their versatility is attractive to riders who intend to spend weeks, months, even years travelling on two wheels.

Parallel-twin chain drive

In 2007, BMW launched two new chain driven GS models using a 798 cc parallel-twin engine, the F800GS and F650GS.

It has twin 300 mm discs at the front with optional ABS.

It has a single 300 mm disc at the front with optional ABS.

Both models feature chain drive, but the other F-series motorcycles now use a reinforced kevlar belt drive which requires less maintenance.

Popularity 
There are numerous owners clubs dedicated to the bike. There is an aftermarket of motorcycle accessories for the GS range which includes aluminium luggage, saddles, shock absorbers, screens, lights and GPS mountings.

In 2004, the R1150GS Adventure became a top seller after being used by actors Ewan McGregor and Charley Boorman in their journey Long Way Round. It was a major sales coup for BMW as the duo had initially approached KTM for sponsorship for the trip, who then turned McGregor and Boorman down.
the journey involved riding from London to New York by going east across Europe, central Asia, Alaska, Canada and the USA. They continued their association with the GS when Boorman used an F650RR during his 2006 Dakar Rally attempt, 
which was  documented in the book and TV series Race to Dakar, and again in 2007 when both used the R1200GS Adventure in their journey Long Way Down, in which they rode from John o' Groats at the northern tip of Scotland, to Cape Agulhas in South Africa at the southern tip of the African continent.

Both the R1200GS and the F650GS were featured in the BBC TV series The Hairy Bikers' Cookbook, ridden by chefs Dave Myers and Si King.

Rush drummer and lyricist Neil Peart used an R1100GS for a 14-month,   self-healing trip, documented in the book Ghost Rider: Travels on the Healing Road, 
that he made in the late 1990s following the deaths of his only daughter and wife.
Peart also used the R1200GS with an 1150GS as a backup on his 2004 motorcycle trip between gigs on Rush's 30th Anniversary tour, a trip he documented in the book Roadshow: Landscape with Drums, A Concert Tour By Motorcycle.

Television food personality Alton Brown and his crew rode R1200GS motorcycles during season 2 of the television program Feasting on Asphalt. They rode BMW R1200RT motorcycles during season 1, but found the GS better suited for the backroads they found themselves on.

On 27 July 2007, the BMW R1200GS and R1200GS Adventure reached a production record of 100,000 units since its launch in 2004, making it the most popular BMW motorcycle.
In May 2011, the 2,000,000th motorcycle produced by BMW was a R1200GS.

See also
Simon and Monika Newbound - GS riders who hold the Guinness World Record for motorcycle endurance.
History of BMW motorcycles

References

External links 

XPLORGS BMW Motorrad USA GS website
The History of the BMW GS-Series - 30 Years of the BMW GS at webBikeWorld.com

GS
Motorcycles powered by flat engines
Dual-sport motorcycles
Motorcycles introduced in 1980